Isabelle Sophie Emilie Blais (born June 21, 1975) is a Canadian film and television actress and singer.

History

Isabelle Blais was born on June 21, 1975 in Trois-Rivières, Quebec.  She is a graduate of the Montreal campus of the Conservatoire de musique et d'art dramatique du Québec. She quickly charmed critics by her stage interpretation of Juliet in Romeo and Juliet, and in 2001, won their attention for her role in Soft Shell Man by André Turpin.

In 2002, she appeared in Confessions of a Dangerous Mind by George Clooney.  In 2003, she was awarded a Jutra Award for "Best Supporting Actress" for her role in Québec-Montréal by Ricardo Trogi. In the same year, appeared in The Barbarian Invasions, by Denys Arcand. In 2004, she appeared in a leading role in Les Aimants, by Yves Pelletier, for which she was nominated for a second Jutra Award, for Best Actress, as well as being nominated for a Genie Award for Best Performance by an Actress in a Leading Role. In 2007, she appeared in a supporting role in Sur la trace d'Igor Rizzi, by Noël Mitrani.

Isabelle is also a singer in the Québécois rock group Caïman Fu.

Discography 
 2003 – Caïman Fu
 2006 – Les charmes du quotidien
 2008 – Drôle d'animal

Filmography 
 2001 – Soft Shell Man (Un crabe dans le tête): Marie
 2002 – Confessions of a Dangerous Mind : Chuck's Date No. 2
 2002 – Québec-Montréal
 2002 – Savage Messiah
 2003 – The Barbarian Invasions: Sylvaine
 2004 – Machine Gun Molly (Monica la mitraille): Sylvana
 2004 – Love and Magnets (Les Aimants)
 2005 - Saint Martyrs of the Damned (Saints-Martyrs-des-Damnés)
 2007 – On the Trail of Igor Rizzi (Sur la trace d'Igor Rizzi)
 2007 – Bluff
 2008 – Borderline: Kiki
 2010 – The High Cost of Living: Nathalie
 2010 – Face Time (Le Baiser du barbu): Vicky
 2015 – Blue Thunder (Bleu tonnerre)
 2017 – Tadoussac
 2018 – The Nest (Le nid)

Television
 2005 – Human Trafficking Helena
 2006 – Answered by Fire: Julie Fortin
 2006–2010 – CA: Sarah Lamontagne
 2012–2014 – Trauma: Véronique Bilodeau
 2016 – St. Nickel

Video games
 2014 – Watch Dogs: Clara Lille (voice)

References

External links

1975 births
Living people
French Quebecers
Canadian film actresses
Musicians from Trois-Rivières
Actresses from Quebec
Conservatoire de musique du Québec à Montréal alumni
21st-century Canadian actresses
21st-century Canadian women singers
Canadian women rock singers
French-language singers of Canada
Canadian indie rock musicians
Best Actress Jutra and Iris Award winners
Best Supporting Actress Jutra and Iris Award winners